Tomorrow  is a temporal construct of the relative future; literally of the day after the current day (today), or figuratively of future periods or times.  Tomorrow is usually considered just beyond the present and counter to yesterday. It is important in time perception because it is the first direction the arrow of time takes humans on Earth.

Philosophy
The use of terms such as tomorrow, now and future are part an a-series view which is part of the presentism philosophy of time.

Learning and language
For a young child, "tomorrow" is "an undefined, infinite time of the idea that time is just an infinite and arbitrary definition of an yet unidentified of what we like to call time, yet the child slowly learns the meaning of tomorrow." The concept of "tomorrow" is rarely understood by 3-year-old children, but 4-year-olds understand the idea.

References

Future
Days